The 2013 European F3 Open Championship was the fifth and final season European F3 Open Championship .

Despite missing the opening round of the season, Ed Jones of Team West-Tec was crowned champion by nine points on dropped scores over RP Motorsport driver Sandy Stuvik. The final championship standings were determined after two appeals had been lodged, and upheld, with the Real Automóvil Club de España.

Teams and drivers
 All cars were powered by Toyota engines. All Class A cars are equipped with the Dallara F312 chassis, while Copa Class cars are equipped with the Dallara F308 chassis.

{|
|

Race calendar and results
 An eight-round provisional calendar was revealed on 2 November 2012. This was modified on 7 February 2013, after GT Sport organisers, for practical and technical reasons, moved the Algarve event one week earlier and replaced the Hungaroring event with a race in Jerez, moving it two weeks earlier. All rounds will support the International GT Open series.

Championship standings

Class A
Points were awarded as follows:

Copa F308/300
Points were awarded as follows:

Teams' standings
Points were awarded as follows:

References

External links
 European F3 Open Official Website

Euroformula Open Championship seasons
European F3 Open
European F3 Open
Euroformula Open